Live at Brixton Academy is the first live album by the Australian electronic rock and drum and bass band Pendulum, recorded live at the Brixton Academy in London, England and released on 12 June 2009 by Warner Bros. Records, Earstorm and Breakbeat Kaos. It was produced by Mike Downs and directed by Paul Caslin. The concert features live footage filmed by 12 fans. Six tracks on the DVD extra are fan only edits, with an audience heavy 5.1 remix. The live album was available for pre-order on 8 June 2009, just a week before its release. On 9 June 2009 a special premiere of the live show was put on in an exclusive theater which Pendulum attended. Both the audio CD and DVD contain their live cover of Metallica's Master of Puppets.

Track listing

Personnel
Rob Swire - vocals, synths
Gareth McGrillen - bass guitar
Peredur ap Gwynedd - guitar
Paul Kodish - drums
Ben Mount - MC

References

External links
Pendulum official website

2009 live albums
2009 video albums
Live video albums
Pendulum (drum and bass band) albums
Albums recorded at the Brixton Academy